This article contains a list of fossil-bearing stratigraphic units in the state of Mississippi, U.S.

Sites

See also

 Paleontology in Mississippi

References

 

Mississippi
Stratigraphic units
Stratigraphy of Mississippi
Mississippi geography-related lists
United States geology-related lists